Stephan Geldenhuys (born 18 January 1984) is a rugby union referee, currently on the South African Rugby Union's National Panel.

Career

Geldenhuys began refereeing in 2007, joining the SA Rugby Union's National panel in 2013, and named on an updated panel in 2018. In 2019, he refereed the Dubai Invitational tournament.

External links
SA Rugby Referees Profile

References

Living people
1984 births
South African rugby union referees
SARU referees
Currie Cup referees